Xinhui People's Hospital is a hospital located in the Xinhui District of Jiangmen City, Guangdong Province, China, affiliated to the Southern Medical University.

Synopsis  
It features a hospital headquarters, a clinic and three outpatient departments. The hospital has 1110 beds, a staff of 1,200 and offers  preventive health care, general medical, emergency medical, medical research, clinical teaching and training in one of the Xinhui District's largest general hospitals.

References

External links 
China Daily News
Official Chinese Website

Hospital buildings completed in 1949
Xinhui District
Hospitals in Guangdong
Hospitals established in 1949
1949 establishments in China